This is a list of electoral division results for the Australian 2010 federal election in the state of Queensland.

Overall results

Results by division

Blair

Bonner

Bowman

Brisbane

Capricornia

Dawson

Dickson

Fadden

Fairfax

Fisher

Flynn

Forde

Griffith

Groom

Herbert

Hinkler

Kennedy

Leichhardt

Lilley

Longman

Maranoa

McPherson

Moncrieff

Moreton

Oxley

Petrie

Rankin

Ryan

Wide Bay

Wright

See also 

 2010 Australian federal election
 Results of the 2010 Australian federal election (House of Representatives)
 Post-election pendulum for the 2010 Australian federal election
 Members of the Australian House of Representatives, 2010–2013

Notes

References 

Queensland 2010